Antonio Ortega Gutiérrez (17 January 1888 – 15 July 1939) was a Spanish Republican military officer and acting president of Madrid Football Club between 1937 and 1938 during the Spanish Civil War; directly involved in the defense of Madrid.

Spanish Civil War
A professional officer of the Spanish Army, he supported the Republican government during the Spanish Civil War. Before the war he was a lieutenant of Carabineros of the Second Spanish Republic stationed in Irun. On 6 August 1936, following the Coup, he was appointed civil governor of Guipuzcoa. He took command of the Republican forces during the later part of the Campaign of Guipúzcoa after the capture of Augusto Pérez Garmendia at Oiartzun. In 1937 he was appointed secretary of security and joined the Communist Party of Spain. He was also, among other things, responsible for the arrest of Andreu Nin and because of this, was dismissed by the minister of the interior, Julian Zugazagoitia; eventually being transferred to field command. In March 1939, he was the commander in charge of the III Army Corps of the Army of the Centre and supported Luis Barceló against the National Defence Council (Consejo Nacional de Defensa) during what later became the Final offensive of the Spanish Civil War. At the end of the war, he was captured by the Nationalists, sentenced to death by a military tribunal and subsequently executed by firing squad in Alicante, Spain on 15 July 1939.

President of Real Madrid

As President of Madrid Football Club, as Real Madrid were called during the Second Spanish Republic, he acted on behalf of Rafael Sánchez Guerra, a prominent Republican, who was unable to take an active role in managing the club due to the war. Ortega took over as acting president from another Republican, Juan Jose Vallejo. Together with Gonzalo Aguirre and Valero Rivera, Madrid Vice President and Treasurer, respectively, he was among several Real Madrid board members, captured and executed by Franco's Nationalists, following the city of Madrid's fall.

References

Sources 
  Romero, Eladi, Itinerarios de la Guerra Civil española : guía del viajero curioso, Barcelona : Laertes, 2001, 600 p.
 Barruso, Pedro, Verano y revolución. La guerra civil en Gipuzkoa' (julio-septiembre de 1936), Edita: Haramburu Editor. San Sebastián, 1996.
Pedro Barruso, GIPUZKOA 1936: VERANO Y REVOLUCIÓN, LA GUERRA CIVIL EN GIPUZKOA (Spanish)
 Pedro Barruso, GIPUZKOA 1936: VERANO Y REVOLUCIÓN, LA GUERRA CIVIL EN GIPUZKOA (Spanish)
 
Morbo: The Story of Spanish Football (2003),  Phil Ball. 
''List of missing persons https://web.archive.org/web/20141219110248/http://www.jusap.ejgv.euskadi.net/r47-contmh2/es/contenidos/informacion/listado_personas_desaparecidas/es_memoria/o_listado_personas_desaparecidas.html

1888 births
1939 deaths
Communist Party of Spain politicians
Real Madrid CF presidents
Spanish army officers
Spanish military personnel of the Spanish Civil War (Republican faction)
Executed Spanish people
People executed by Spain by firing squad